Nabil Bousmaha (born 2 December 1990) is an Algerian footballer who plays as a midfielder for CA Bordj Bou Arréridj in the Algerian Ligue Professionnelle 1.

References

External links

1990 births
Living people
Association football midfielders
Algerian footballers
JS Saoura players
21st-century Algerian people